Behind Prison Walls is a 1943 American crime film directed by Steve Sekely and written by Van Norcross. The film stars Alan Baxter, Gertrude Michael, Tully Marshall, Edwin Maxwell, Jacqueline Dalya and Matt Willis. The film was released on March 22, 1943, by Producers Releasing Corporation.

Plot

Cast      
Alan Baxter as Jonathan MacGlennon
Gertrude Michael as Elinor Cantwell
Tully Marshall as James J. MacGlennon
Edwin Maxwell as Percy Webb
Jacqueline Dalya as Mimi
Matt Willis as Frank Lucacelli
Richard Kipling as Frederick Driscoll
Olga Fabian as Yette Kropatchek
Isabel Withers as Whitey O'Neil
Lane Chandler as Reagan
Paul Everton as Warden
George Guhl as Doc
Regina Wallace as Mrs. Cantwell

References

External links
 

1943 films
American crime films
1943 crime films
Producers Releasing Corporation films
Films directed by Steve Sekely
American black-and-white films
1940s English-language films
1940s American films